Jonathan Fox may refer to:

Jonathan Fox (professor of politics), Israeli professor of economic politics
Jonathan Fox (swimmer) (born 1991), British swimmer
Jonathan Fox, police officer played by Larry Lamb in The Bill

See also
Jon D. Fox (1947–2018), politician
John Fox (disambiguation)